Sweet Rhode Island Red is a studio album by Ike & Tina Turner released on United Artist Records in 1974. The album was created exclusively for the international market. It was available in the US through the Columbia Record Club. Sweet Rhode Island Red charted at No. 41 in Australia.

Recording and content 
Sweet Rhode Island Red was recorded at the Ike & Tina Turner's Bolic Sound studio. A majority of the songs from the album were written by Tina Turner, including the title track which was released as a single in February 1974. "Sweet Rhode Island Red" peaked at No. 43 on the Billboard R&B chart, No. 43 in Germany, No. 17 in Italy and No. 51 on the UK Singles Chart.

The follow-up single "Sexy Ida" was released in two versions: the funk rhythmic A-side, "Sexy Ida (Part 1)," and the up-temp B-side, "Sexy Ida (Part 2)." "Sexy Ida (Part 1)" reached No. 29 on Billboard R&B chart and No. 65 on the Billboard Hot 100. In Europe it peaked at No. 51 on the UK Singles Chart and No. 35 in Italy. "Sexy Ida (Part 2)" features rock musician Marc Bolan on guitar. It peaked at No. 85 on the Hot 100 and No. 9 on the R&B chart. Both parts were not registered in time to be included on the initial release of Sweet Rhode Island Red. However, the songs were later included on the track list in selected countries.

Reissues 
Sweet Rhode Island Red was digitally remastered and released by BGO Records in 2012 on the compilation CD Sweet Rhode Island Red/The Gospel According To Ike & Tina.

Track listing

Chart performance

References 

1974 albums
Ike & Tina Turner albums
Albums produced by Ike Turner
United Artists Records albums
Rock albums by American artists
Soul albums by American artists
Albums produced by Gerhard Augustin
Albums recorded at Bolic Sound